Bahçedere is a village in the Gerede District, Bolu Province, Turkey. Its population is 94 (2021).

References

Villages in Gerede District